Ichtadenovirus is a genus of viruses, in the family Adenoviridae. Fish serve as natural hosts. There is only one species in this genus: Sturgeon ichtadenovirus A.

Structure
Viruses in Ichtadenovirus are non-enveloped, with icosahedral geometries, and T=25 symmetry. The diameter is around 90 nm. Genomes are linear and non-segmented, around 35-36kb in length. The genome codes for 40 proteins.

Life cycle
Viral replication is nuclear. Entry into the host cell is achieved by attachment of the viral fiber glycoproteins to host receptors, which mediates endocytosis. Replication follows the DNA strand displacement model. DNA-templated transcription, with some alternative splicing mechanism is the method of transcription. The virus exits the host cell by nuclear envelope breakdown, viroporins, and lysis. Fishes serve as the natural host.

References

External links
 Viralzone: Ichtadenovirus
 ICTV

Adenoviridae
Virus genera